The Investigator Group is an archipelago in South Australia that consists of Flinders Island  and five island groups located off the western coast of the Eyre Peninsula.  It is named after  by her commander, Matthew Flinders when he explored the area in 1802. The Group lies within the Great Australian Bight. All the islands except Flinders Island, and a part of Pearson Island, are within the Investigator Group Wilderness Protection Area and the Waldegrave Islands Conservation Park.

Description

Generally
The group consists of the following islands and island groups placed in order of increasing distance from Cape Finniss: the Waldegrave Islands, The Watchers, Flinders Island, Topgallant Islands, the Ward Islands and the Pearson Isles.

Waldgrave Islands

The northernmost group lies 3 km offshore near the small town of Elliston. It consists of Waldegrave (292 ha) and Little Waldegrave (32 ha) Islands. They have calcarenite soils and were grazed by sheep until 1967. The vegetation is mainly regenerating pasture, with patches of native shrubland dominated by Native Juniper and Coast Daisy-bush.

The Watchers

The eastern rock is charted as an intertidal reef.

Flinders Island
Flinders Island, which is 28 km offshore and at 36 km2 is the largest island in the Investigator Group. Flinders Island is leasehold land used for grazing. It has sandy, calcarenite soils, is mainly vegetated with pasture grasses, and has some remnant patches of heathland and Melaleuca woodland.

Topgallant Islands

Ward Islands

Pearson Isles

The  southernmost group consists of Pearson Island (213 ha), the Veteran Isles (14 ha) and Dorothee Island (56 ha). Pearson Island, the second largest of the whole Investigator Group, and containing its highest point at 231 m above sea level, is vegetated with shrub and heathland with patches of Casuarina and Melaleuca woodland. The Veteran Isles support low shrubland dominated by Twiggy Daisy-bush and Marsh Saltbush. Lying 3 km south-south-west of the Veteran Isles is Dorothee Island, the most southerly of the Investigator Group.

History

European discovery
On Saturday, 13 February 1802, Flinders gave the name Investigator Group to the group of islands consisting of Flinders Island, the Pearson Islands, the Topgallant Islands, the Waldegrave Islands and Ward Islands.

Protected area status and other designations

Reserves declared by the South Australian government
Protected area status has been conferred to all islands within the group with exception of the majority of Flinders Island and part of Pearson Island.
The Investigator Group Wilderness Protection Area comprises Ward Islands, Top Gallant Isles, Pearson Isles with exception of a portion of land on Pearson Island which is held by the Australian Maritime Safety Authority for "lighthouse purposes".
The Waldegrave Islands Conservation Park occupies the Waldegrave Island, Little Waldegrave Island and the Watchers.
A heritage agreement has been in force on Flinders Island since 1995 in respect to a strip of land along the north coast of the island extending west from the island’s most northerly headland, Point Malcolm.
As of 2012, the Investigator Marine Park includes the waters adjoining Flinders Island, Topgallant Isles, the Ward Islands and the Pearson Isles.

Non-statutory arrangements

Investigator Islands Important Bird Area
The group was identified by BirdLife International as an Important Bird Area (IBA) known as the Investigator Islands (sic) Important Bird Area in 2009, because of its population of the vulnerable species, the fairy tern, as well as significant populations of Cape Barren geese, Pacific gull and black-faced cormorant. Other birds for which the IBA is significant include large numbers of breeding short-tailed shearwaters and white-faced storm-petrels. The biome-restricted rock parrot has been recorded from most islands in the group. The islands met the IBA criteria in 2009.

See also
 List of archipelagos

Citations and references

Citations

References

	

Islands of South Australia
Great Australian Bight
Penguin colonies